Trevor Dannatt OBE (15 January 1920 – 16 February 2021) was a British architect.

Career
He studied architecture at the Regent's Polytechnic. In 1943 he joined the practice of modernist architects Max Fry and Jane Drew. In 1948 he joined the London County Council architects department, where he worked on the Royal Festival Hall. Peter Moro was his team leader. In 1952 he formed his own practice.

He was elected to the Royal Academy in 1983 and was awarded an OBE in the 2016 New Year Honours. He died in February 2021 at the age of 101.

National Life Stories conducted an oral history interview (C467/70) with Trevor Dannatt in 2001 for its Architects Lives' collection held by the British Library.

Works
 Intercontinental Hotel and King   Faisal Conference Hall, Riyadh Saudi Arabia
 Royal Festival Hall
 Laslett House, Cambridge
 Royal Botanic Gardens Kew, Victoria Gate building
 Blackheath Quaker Meeting House

References

External links
 Dannatt Johnson practice website Slide show of notable works
 

1920 births
2021 deaths
Architects from London
British centenarians
Officers of the Order of the British Empire
Royal Academicians
Place of birth missing
Place of death missing
Men centenarians